= HIV/AIDS in the United Arab Emirates =

Official figures show that 540 people were living with HIV/AIDS in the United Arab Emirates by the end of 2006, and the number of recorded new cases is about 35 annually. The United Arab Emirates' national HIV/AIDS-prevention strategy is in the early development stages, though the National Program for AIDS Control and Prevention has been in place since 1985.

The United Arab Emirates has imposed HIV/AIDS travel restrictions on persons applying for a work or residence visa. An HIV/AIDS test is required for work or residence permits; testing must be performed after arrival.

Migrant workers infected with HIV are denied all health care benefits. They are quarantined, and subsequently deported.
